Newborough is a civil parish in the district of East Staffordshire, Staffordshire, England.  The parish contains ten listed buildings that are recorded in the National Heritage List for England.  All the listed buildings are designated at Grade II, the lowest of the three grades, which is applied to "buildings of national importance and special interest".  The parish contains the village of Newborough and the surrounding countryside.  The listed buildings include farmhouses and farm buildings, a small country house and associated structures, a thatched cottage, a church, and three mileposts.


Buildings

References

Citations

Sources

Lists of listed buildings in Staffordshire